Diaphora luctuosa is a moth of the family Erebidae. It was described by Jacob Hübner in 1831. It is found in the Alps, on the Balkan Peninsula and in the Black Sea region.

The wingspan is 26–31 mm.

The larvae feed on various low-growing plants.

References

Spilosomina
Moths described in 1831
Moths of Europe